Karamusul is a village in Lüleburgaz, Kirklareli, Turkey.

Villages in Lüleburgaz District